Tommy Tam Fu-wing (born 19 August 1946), known professionally by his stage name Tik Lung, is a Hong Kong actor, known for his numerous starring roles in a string of Shaw Brothers Studio's films, particularly The Blood Brothers, The Avenging Eagle, Clans of Intrigue, The Duel, The Sentimental Swordsman and its sequel, as well as the classic John Woo film A Better Tomorrow and its sequel.

Early life 
On 19 August 1946, Ti was born as Tam Fu Wing (譚富榮) in Xinhui District, Guangzhou, Guangdong, China into a family with 4 members including himself, his parents and a younger sister. When he was 4 years old, the whole family moved to Hong Kong. He was educated at the Eton School in Hong Kong. However, after his father's death, he had to terminate his studies at the age of 11 in order to support his family. Initially, he worked as a delivery boy at a grocery store where he often delivered milk, newspapers and groceries.  At 17, he trained as a tailor and studied Wing Chun with the master Jiu Wan in order to protect himself against street gangs.

Career 
In 1968, after he graduated year 2 college, Ti Lung responded to an advertisement placed by the Shaw Brothers and applied to the Shaw Acting Course. Upon graduation from the class, he was able to secure a minor role in Chang Cheh's Return of the One-Armed Swordsman starring Jimmy Wang Yu. Chang Cheh immediately recognized his potential and offered him the lead role in his next production Dead End opposite Golden Chan Hung-lit, a role which would launch his career as one of the best known faces in classic Wuxia films. At that time, he continued to study Wing Chun under the martial arts master Jiu Wan who described him as having the advantages of a strong body, intelligence, speed, good footwork and a diligent work ethic. Jiu Wan granted Ti Lung a certificate upon completion of his martial arts training in Wing Chun, and Ti Lung subsequently learned other martial arts (and performance art skills) such as Judo, Muay Thai, Taekwondo, Wushu and horseback riding. Later on in his career, Ti Lung became a common face associated with David Chiang, Alexander Fu Sheng, Ku Feng, Chen Kuan-Tai, the Venom Mob and other major Shaw Bros stars at the time, often cast as a dashing, noble hero as well as a capable martial artist.

Ti Lung is also perhaps more known for his collaborations with the most revered of Shaw Studio directors - Chang Cheh - who turned him into a star along with fellow actor and frequent co-star David Chiang in over 20 films: Dead End (1969), Have Sword, Will Travel (1969), Vengeance (1970), The Heroic Ones (1970), The Duel (1971), Duel of Fists (1971), The Deadly Duo (1971), Angry Guest (1972), Four Riders (1972), The Blood Brothers (1973) and The Pirate (1973). Due to their successes, the trio eventually became known as "The Iron Triangle." During the early 1970s, one of Ti Lung's most notable feature films was The Blood Brothers (1973) which netted him The Special Award for Outstanding Performance at the 11th Golden Horse Awards in Taiwan and the Special Jury Award at the Asian Film Awards in 1973. In 1974 Ti Lung starred together with Les Humphries Singers in the German film Es knallt - und die Engel singer directed by Roberto Leoni (as Butch Lion). Soon after, Ti Lung moved forward ins his career by teaming up with Lar Kar-Leung, Chu Yuan, Sun Chung and Tong Gai to produce movies still loved today such as The Magic Blade (1976), Clans of Intrigue (1977), The Sentimental Swordsman (1977), The Avenging Eagle (1978) and Shaolin Prince (1983).

The famous standard formula of wuxia movies produced by the Shaw Brothers took Chu Yuan as the director, Gu Long as the original playwright and Ti Lung as the hero. Chu Yuan directed more Gu Long movies than any other director did, and Ti Lung appeared in more Chu Yuan films than any other actor, including Clans of Intrigue in 1977, Legend of the Bat in 1978, The Magic Blade in 1976 and The Sentimental Swordsman in 1977. In 1979, he won a Best Actor Award at the 25th Asian Film Awards as Black Eagle Chik Ming-Sing in The Avenging Eagle in 1978.

After he left Shaw Brothers Studios in the 1980s, Ti Lung's career took a turn for the worse until 1986, when John Woo cast him opposite Chow Yun-fat in A Better Tomorrow for the role of a Triad member, Sung-Tse Ho. The movie was a massive box office success and placed Ti Lung squarely back in the public consciousness, although it changed his image from the handsome young martial artist to the tortured, would-be hero gangster. His role in the film also won him a Best Actor Award at the 23rd Golden Horse Awards in 1986. After that role, Ti Lung's next most recognizable appearance would be with Jackie Chan in Drunken Master II, in which he co-starred as Wong Kei-Ying, father of Chinese folk hero Wong Fei Hung. In 1994-95, Ti Lung lead-starred as Bao Zheng in a Hong Kong version of the Justice Pao TV series for TVB. At the time this series was playing on Hong Kong television, many fans in Mainland China and Hong Kong favorably compared Ti Lung/TVB's Bao Zheng with Jin Chao-chun/Mainland China's Bao Zheng. Ti Lung also worked with Andy Lau in Three Kingdoms: Resurrection of the Dragon as the legendary Guan Yu. From there, he has continued to steadily work in television in a variety of roles.

In 1999, Ti Lung experienced a comeback in movies by playing the role of Sir Lung in The Kid (1999), which enabled him to achieve a Best Supporting Actor award at the 19th Hong Kong Film Awards in 2000. In 2007, he received a Life Achievement Award at the Golden Bauhinia Awards. Until 2015, he played Master Lam in a Hong Kong and Malaysia feature film co-production, The Kid from the Big Apple. The role won him a Best Actor Award at the 7th Macau International Movie Festival. The sequel to the film is slated to premiere in Malaysia in November 2017.

The origin of the stage name "Ti Lung" 
When he was a child, Ti Lung greatly admired the French actor Alain Delon. In 1968, at Shaw Brothers Studio, he asked production to choose a name for him which would sound like Alain Delon's in the hope of being as good an actor as he was. One day a secretary from the production (Mona Fong) found the name of "Ti Lung" for him and it stuck, "Ti" being a lucky name and "Lung" meaning dragon.

Personal life 
Ti Lung married beauty queen and actress Tao Man Ming in 1975. In 1980, Tao gave birth to a son, Shaun Tam Chun-yin (譚俊彦). He is also the uncle of Jerry Lamb and Jan Lamb.

Filmography

Film

Television

Awards

References

External links 
 
 

1946 births
Living people
Hong Kong male film actors
Shaw Brothers Studio
Hong Kong male television actors
People from Xinhui District
Hong Kong kung fu practitioners
Sportspeople from Guangdong
Male actors from Guangdong
20th-century Hong Kong male actors
21st-century Hong Kong male actors
Chinese male film actors
Chinese male television actors
20th-century Chinese male actors
21st-century Chinese male actors
Wing Chun practitioners from Hong Kong
Chinese Wing Chun practitioners